Adolphe Deitte (1879–1949) was a French colonial administrator; from 1928 until 1929 he was lieutenant governor of Chad. He served as that colony's governor from 1934 until 1935. He was the lieutenant-governor of Mauritania from 5 July - August 1934 and governor of Côte d'Ivoire from 1935 until 1936, replacing Dieudonné Reste in that capacity. In his turn he was replaced in Abidjan by Gaston Mondon.

See also
List of colonial heads of Chad
List of colonial heads of Côte d'Ivoire

References
 Aux origines de la nation ivoirienne

Bibliography
Marcel Souzy, Les coloniaux français illustres, B. Arnaud, Paris, 1940

French colonial governors and administrators
French colonial governors of Mauritania
1879 births
1949 deaths
Governors of Ubangi-Shari
French people in French Chad